William Dale Phillips (1925-1993) was an American chemist, nuclear magnetic resonance spectroscopist, federal science policy advisor and member of the National Academy of Sciences.  He was born October 10, 1925, in Kansas City, Missouri and died in St. Louis, Missouri, on December 15, 1993.

Training
Phillips graduated from public high school and immediately entered the U.S. Navy V-12 program in 1943.  He studied mechanical engineering at the University of Texas, was commissioned, and left active duty in 1946.  Phillips completed a bachelor's degree in chemistry in 1948 at the University of Kansas and obtained a PhD in physical chemistry at MIT under the direction of Richard C. Lord studying the vibrational spectra of organic molecules.

Career
In 1951, Phillips joined DuPont Central Research.  He held positions starting with research chemist, rising to research supervisor, manager and assistant and associate director.  Phillips began to explore the nascent field of nuclear magnetic resonance (NMR).  His initial interest was in molecular motion in organic systems.  Together with Earl Muetterties, he also explored molecular dynamics in inorganic systems.  DuPont's strength in organofluorine chemistry and cyanocarbon chemistry led to investigation of those systems.  His work on paramagnetic molecules was the foundation of modern paramagnetic shift reagents and MRI imaging.

Phillips' interests then turned toward the biological.  His particular interests were ferredoxins, and lysozyme. He also had a strong interest in the NMR and ESR of nucleic acids and other biological macromolecules.

To further his understanding of biochemistry, he took a DuPont Industrial Postdoctoral in 1962 to go to MIT in biochemistry.  In 1973 he was on assignment from DuPont to ICI as liaison to their program to produce protein for animal feed from methane through fermentation microbiology.  Retiring from DuPont Central Research in 1978, Phillips assumed the positions of chair and Charles Allen Thomas professor of chemistry at Washington University in St. Louis.

In 1984 he joined Mallinckrodt, Inc. as senior vice-president for research and development.  He accepted a role on the Bush administration's Science Advisory Board.  He chaired the National Critical Technologies Panel through the National Academy of Sciences.  He served on the editorial boards of several scientific journals and on the boards of directors of Mallinckrodt, Sigma-Aldrich, the Missouri Corporation for Science and Technology, the St. Louis Science Center, the St. Louis Technology Center, and Celgene Corporation.

References

External links
Biography at The National Academy Press

1925 births
1993 deaths
People from Elgin, Illinois
Scientists from St. Louis
American physical chemists
Members of the United States National Academy of Sciences
DuPont people
United States Navy officers
United States Navy personnel of World War II
Chemists from Missouri
Military personnel from Illinois
Cockrell School of Engineering alumni
University of Kansas alumni
Massachusetts Institute of Technology alumni
Washington University in St. Louis faculty